Ceola Clark III (born January 13, 1989) is an American professional basketball player who last played for Tajfun of the Liga Nova KBM. He played college basketball for the Western Illinois University.

College years
Clark III played collegiate basketball six years for the Western Illinois University.

College statistics

|-
| style="text-align:left;"| 2008–09
| style="text-align:left;"| Western Illinois
| 29 || 5 || 26.1 || .517 || .477 || .782 || 3.2 || 2.5 || 1.7 || 0.0 || 7.7
|-
| style="text-align:left;"| 2009–10
| style="text-align:left;"| Western Illinois
| 27 || 23 || 35.5 || .471 || .406 || .750 || 5.0 || 3.2 || 2.7 || 0.2 || 14.2
|-
| style="text-align:left;"| 2010–11
| style="text-align:left;"| Western Illinois
| 6 || 6 || 34.2 || .411 || .313 || .727 || 3.3 || 5.0 || 2.3 || 0.2 || 10.7
|-
| style="text-align:left;"| 2011–12
| style="text-align:left;"| Western Illinois
| 32 || 32 || 37.4 || .449 || .462 || .733 || 3.6 || 4.7 || 1.6 || 0.1 || 13.3
|-
| style="text-align:left;"| 2012–13
| style="text-align:left;"| Western Illinois
| 30 || 30 || 35.6 || .426 || .415 || .820 || 3.3 || 4.1 || 1.9 || 0.1 || 12.5
|- class="sortbottom"
| style="text-align:left;"| Career
| style="text-align:left;"|
| 124 || 96 || 33.8 || .462 || .435 || .769 || 3.7 || 3.7 || 2.0 || 0.1 || 11.9

Professional career
After going undrafted in the 2013 NBA draft, Clark III signed with Sigal Prishtina of the ETC Superleague for the 2013–14 season. On 11 September 2014, Clark signed a one-year deal with the Slovenian team KK Šentjur.
He is a great 3 point shooter, he won the All star 3pt contest in Slovenia.

External links
 at espn.go.com
 at sports.yahoo.com
 at goleathernecks.com
 at mysummitleague.com
 at basketball.realgm.com
 at basketball.eurobasket.com

1989 births
Living people
American expatriate basketball people in Slovenia
Basketball players from Illinois
People from Waukegan, Illinois
Western Illinois Leathernecks men's basketball players
KK Šentjur players
American men's basketball players
Point guards